Anton Baumstark (14 April 1800 in Sinzheim – 2 February 1876 in Freiburg im Breisgau) was a German classical philologist. He was the brother of economist Eduard Baumstark (1807–1889) and the father of historian Reinhold Baumstark (1831–1900). His grandson, Carl Anton Baumstark (1872–1948), was a noted orientalist and liturgist.

He studied philology at the University of Heidelberg, where his instructors included Friedrich Christoph Schlosser and Georg Friedrich Creuzer. Beginning in 1826 he taught classes at the Lyceum in Freiburg im Breisgau, and in 1836, was appointed professor of classical philology at the University of Freiburg as well as director of the philological seminar.

Selected works 
 "De curatoribus emporii et nautodicis apud Athenienses", 1827.
 "Caesaris de bello commentarii gallico et civili", 1828.
 "Lectiones Tullianae", 1832, (Lessons of Tullian).
 "Cajus Julius Cäsar's Werke", 1835–40, (Works by Caius Julius Caesar).
 "Ausführliche Erläuterung des allgemeinen Theiles der Germania des Tacitus", 1875.

References

External links
 

1800 births
1876 deaths
People from Rastatt (district)
Heidelberg University alumni
Academic staff of the University of Freiburg
German classical philologists